Daynellis Montejo (born November 8, 1984) is a female Cuban Taekwondo practitioner who competes at the 2008 Summer Olympics in the -49 kg class.  She received a Bronze Medal for Her placement in the Repechage.

References
 Athlete bio at 2008 Olympics site

1984 births
Living people
Cuban female taekwondo practitioners
Olympic taekwondo practitioners of Cuba
Taekwondo practitioners at the 2007 Pan American Games
Taekwondo practitioners at the 2008 Summer Olympics
Olympic bronze medalists for Cuba
Olympic medalists in taekwondo
Medalists at the 2008 Summer Olympics
World Taekwondo Championships medalists
Pan American Games competitors for Cuba
21st-century Cuban women